Harjeet Singh (born 11 February 1996) is an Indian professional field hockey player who plays as a midfielder

He captained the Indian squad at the 2016 Men's Hockey Junior World Cup that went unbeaten throughout the tournament, eventually winning a gold medal.

Club career
Harjeet played for the Uttar Pradesh Wizards and the Delhi Waveriders in the Hockey India League. In July 2019 he signed for Dutch club HGC in the Hoofdklasse where he played for one season.

References

External links 
 

1996 births
Living people
Field hockey players from Punjab, India
Indian male field hockey players
Male field hockey midfielders
Hockey India League players
Men's Hoofdklasse Hockey players
HGC players
Expatriate field hockey players